M is the fourth single album by South Korean band Big Bang, and the first from their Made Series. It marks the first comeback for them after a three-year absence, which is also their first single album in nine years.

Background and release

On April 17,  YG Entertainment revealed the first teaser picture. Later, trailer for BigBang's Made World Tour was unveiled. YG Entertainment announced the title tracks of BigBang's "MADE Series: M" in the third teaser. Two of the four teasers for D-1 to D-4 consist of the song info, including who was responsible for the tracks' composition. G-Dragon revealed during the second concert of Made World Tour that he had a hard time making the album, since there are a big expectations for BigBang's comeback, he said, "In all honesty, I was in a slump that wasn't a normal slump. I worried a lot. The group has grown due to all the fans, so I unknowingly felt a heavy burden because it's been a long time since we released an album. I worried a lot because of this, but we worked well, as we continued." He added, "I thought to myself that I just need to work. We got together frequently and worked."

The album opened for pre-order on 24 to 30 April consisting of two singles which are both title tracks and is released worldwide through iTunes, Melon and other online music portals on May 1. There are two different versions of the album; M (black) and m (white). One contains only CD and Booklet (24p) while the other one contains CD, Booklet (24p) + Special kit (Puzzle ticket, 5 photo cards and 1 limited photo card) + Poster.

Commercial performance
M charted at number one on the Gaon Album Chart selling 130,130 copies in just two days, peaking at number two in April. The album sold 137,261 copies in the first half of 2015. The group debuted on Billboard's 'World Digital Songs' chart with "Loser" charting 1st place and "Bae Bae" charting 2nd place on May 7. The music videos were also ranked 3rd and 4th most viewed K-pop M/V videos in the U.S. (April) according to Billboard.

Promotion
After performing both songs during their Made Tour, BigBang held their first comeback stage on Inkigayo on May 3, 2015. On May 6, YG Entertainment announced the release of special clips for "Bae Bae" on 6 to 10 May. BigBang had their second comeback on May 7 installment of MNET's M Countdown. On the May 10 episode on Inkigayo, BigBang made their third comeback. BigBang also appeared on KBS' "Happy Together" on May 20, the first time featuring all of the members in a variety show.

In May 2015, BigBang started a cover contest, the contestant can upload any type of cover for "Loser" and "Bae Bae". The winners will win album, get featured on the playlist of BigBang's official YouTube Channel and get the chance to audition at YG Entertainment. The submission started on May 18 till May 29, 2015. a total of 404 videos were submitted, the winners were announced on June 19.

Accolades

Track listing

Charts

Weekly charts

Monthly charts

Year-end chart

Sales

Release history

Notes

References

External links
 
 
Big Bang Official Website

BigBang (South Korean band) albums
2015 albums
YG Entertainment albums
Avex Group albums
Korean-language albums
Single albums
Albums produced by Teddy Park
Albums produced by G-Dragon